Andrea Rushton (born December 10, 1979 in Victoria, British Columbia) is a field hockey player from Canada, who was selected in the Junior Women's National Team for the 1999 National Camp and series against The United States Junior Team.

Rushton is a defence player, who first started playing hockey in 1987 in Victoria Junior Development Program.

International Senior Tournaments
 2001 – Americas Cup, Jamaica (3rd)
 2001 – World Cup Qualifier, Amiens/Abbeville, France (10th)
 2002 – Commonwealth Games, Manchester (7th)
 2003 – Pan American Games, Santo Domingo (5th)
 2004 – Pan Am Cup, Bridgetown, Barbados (3rd)
 2006 – Commonwealth Games, Melbourne, Australia (8th)
 2007 – Pan American Games, Rio de Janeiro (5th)

References
 "Andrea RUSHTON", Field Hockey Canada (FHC). Retrieved Jan 11, 2011.

1979 births
Living people
Canadian female field hockey players
Canadian people of British descent
Field hockey players from Victoria, British Columbia
Field hockey players at the 2002 Commonwealth Games
Field hockey players at the 2006 Commonwealth Games
Field hockey players at the 2007 Pan American Games
Commonwealth Games competitors for Canada
Pan American Games competitors for Canada
20th-century Canadian women
21st-century Canadian women